Sewickley Creek is a  long 4th order tributary to the Youghiogheny River in Westmoreland County, Pennsylvania.  This is the only stream of this name in the United States.

Variant names
According to the Geographic Names Information System, it has also been known historically as:
Sewickey Creek

Course
Sewickley Creek rises in a pond about 1 mile north of Pleasant Unity, Pennsylvania, and then flows westerly to join the Youghiogheny River across from Collinsburg.

Watershed
Sewickley Creek drains  of area, receives about 43.3 in/year of precipitation, has a wetness index of 370.17, and is about 45% forested.

See also 
 List of rivers of Pennsylvania

References

External links
 Sewickley Creek Watershed Association
 Sewickley Creek Watershed Conservation Plan
 Sewickley Creek Watershed Assessment

Tributaries of the Youghiogheny River
Rivers of Pennsylvania
Rivers of Westmoreland County, Pennsylvania
Allegheny Plateau